= Michael Musheno =

American political scientist

- Awards: Herbert Simon Award (APSA)

Academic background
- Education: The American University (MA, PhD), Lycoming College (BA)

Academic work
- Discipline: Law
- Institutions: University of Oregon, Arizona State University

Michael Musheno is an American political scientist and emeritus Professor of Law at the University of Oregon. He is also emeritus Professor of Justice and Social Inquiry at Arizona State University. He is a winner of the Herbert Simon Award (APSA) for the book Cops, Teachers, Counselors: Stories from the Front-Lines of Public Service.

== Books ==
- Calvin Morrill and Michael Musheno. Navigating Conflict: How Youth Handle Trouble in a High Poverty School. Chicago: University of Chicago Press, 2018.
- Michael Musheno and Susan Ross, Deployed: How Reservists Bear the Burdens of Iraq. Ann Arbor: University of Michigan Press, 2008. (Paperback Edition:March 2009)
- Steven Maynard-Moody and Michael Musheno. Cops, Teachers, Counselors: Stories from the Front Lines of Public Service. Ann Arbor: University of Michigan Press, 2003, 220 pp. (Paperback Edition: January 2004)
- Lisa Bower, David Goldberg, and Michael Musheno (eds.), Between Law and Culture: Relocating Legal Studies. Minneapolis, MN: University of Minnesota Press, 2001, 337 pp.
- Trish Oberweis and Michael Musheno, Knowing Rights: State Workers Stories of Power, Identity and Morality. Hampshire, England: Ashgate/Dartmouth Publishers Limited, 2001, 123 pp.
- David Altheide, Gray Cavender, John Hepburn, John Johnson, Nancy Jurik, Pat Lauderdale, Michael Musheno and Marjorie Zatz (Co-Editors), New Directions in the Study of Justice, Law and Social Control. NY: Plenum Press, 1990, 281 pp.
- James Levine, Michael Musheno and Dennis Palumbo, Criminal Justice in America: Law in Action. New York: John Wiley and Co., 1986, 665 pp.
- David Aaronson, C. Thomas Dienes and Michael Musheno, Public Policy and Police Discretion: Processes of Decriminalization. New York: Clark Boardman Co., Ltd., 1984, 496 pp.
- David Aaronson, C. Thomas Dienes and Michael Musheno, Decriminalization: Tracing the Implementation of a Public Policy. Washington, D.C.: GPO, 1982, 320 pp.
- James Levine, Michael Musheno and Dennis Palumbo, Criminal Justice: A Public Policy Approach. New York: Harcourt, Brace, Jovanovich, 1980, 590 pp.
